The tritos is an eclipse cycle of 3,986.628 days (about 10 years, 11 months).
It corresponds to:
135 synodic months 
146.50144 draconic months
11.50144 eclipse years (23 eclipse seasons)
144.68135 anomalistic months.

The length of the tritos is equal to the length of the inex minus the length of the saros eclipse cycles.  Therefore, eclipses that occur 1 tritos apart (i.e. both eclipses belong to the same tritos series), belong to two different saros series with series numbers that differ by one.

The pre-Columbian Maya used a calculation in their own observations of eclipse cycles in which a period of three tritoses was approximated by 11960 days, based on 46 periods of their tzolk'in calendar (i.e. 46 × 260 days). The number of anomalistic months in a tritos (144.68), having a fraction near , means every third eclipse is in nearly the same position in the elliptical orbit, so eclipses will have similar timing and total versus annular quality.

Solar and lunar eclipse event dates will repeat on this cycle for about 700 years.

Example solar Tritos series

Example lunar Tritos series

See also 
 Eclipse cycle
 Inex - related series

References 
 Mathematical Astronomy Morsels, Jean Meeus, Willmann-Bell, Inc., 1997 (Chapter 9, p. 51, Table 9.A Some eclipse Periodicities)

Eclipses